is a Japanese light novel series written by Roy and illustrated by Ririnra. It is about a man who is chosen by three gods to be reincarnated into a fantasy world after living a sad life, using his past knowledge combined with new powers bestowed to him by said gods to help others and live a bountiful life. It began serialization online in January 2014 on the user-generated novel publishing website Shōsetsuka ni Narō, with a revised version began serialization since September 2015.

The series was later acquired by Hobby Japan, which has published twelve volumes since September 2017 under its HJ Novels imprint. A manga adaptation with art by Ranran has been serialized online via Square Enix's Manga UP! website since November 2017 and has been collected in nine tankōbon volumes. The light novel is licensed in North America by J-Novel Club, while the manga is licensed by Square Enix. An anime television series adaptation by Maho Film aired from October to December 2020. A second season premiered in January 2023.

Plot
Ryoma Takebayashi is a lonely man who led a life filled with hardships until he dies from an unfortunate accident during his sleep. In the afterlife, he is greeted by three gods who grew fond of him and send him to another world as a child, where he makes use of his innate knowledge and abilities, combined with the gods' blessings, to live a new life filled with challenges and happy meetings.

Characters

Main characters

Ryoma lived an uneventful life as an office worker/salaryman in Japan before dying in his sleep. It is later revealed that Earth's god had tormented Ryoma during his entire life just for amusement in order to break his spirit and make him become a murderer, but arranged his early demise after failing to do so. Due to his diligent and kind behavior, Ryoma earns the grace of three gods from Seilfall who bring him to their world as an 8-year-old boy where he lives in a forest for three years while polishing his skills and taming hundreds of slimes, making use of their multiple abilities in various tasks from combat and hunting to cleaning and crafting, until meeting the Jamil family who warmly welcomes him among them. Determined to live independently, he refuses to overindulge on their hospitality and looks for ways to make ends meet by himself. Like other reincarnated humans from Earth, Ryoma is what the locals call a "Child of God" with outstanding magical powers and keeps it a secret from others (with a few exceptions) to prevent that anyone with ill intent appears to take advantage of him.

Heir to the Jamil dukedom, Eliaria is an 11-year-old girl who becomes Ryoma's closest friend. Like Ryoma, she is a monster tamer and her body is gifted with large magic potential, descending from two Children of God: one was an ancient and powerful king and other was a powerful tamer, but she has difficulty controlling it, until Ryoma teaches her how to train herself properly. After Ryoma decides to stay in Gimul, she frequently exchanges letters with him. Eliaria later moves to the Imperial Academy at the capital for her studies and makes some new friends, but her magical prowess make others suspect that she is a Child of God, including her family, until Ryoma reveals the truth about himself to the Jamil family and assures them that she is not one.

Jamil Household

The Duke of Jamil and Eliaria's father, he meets Ryoma in the forest and becomes his friend, later inviting him to live with his family.

Duchess of Jamil and Reinhart's wife. Upon meeting Ryoma, she quickly grows attached to him, treating the boy like her own son.

 
The former Duke of Jamil, he is Reinhart's father and a well known monster tamer. He also is one of Ryoma's closest confidants to whom he entrusts him the secret that he is a Child of God.

One of the Jamil family's bodyguards, he gets injured while fighting a bear and rescued by Ryoma, leading his first encounter with Reinhart. He later becomes Lulinese's husband.
Lulunese
A female cat beastkin who is a maid of the Jamil Household. She later becomes Hughes' wife.

Deities

The goddess of healing and love with the appearance of beautiful young woman. When she visited Earth, she spent her time eating whatever she wanted.

The god of life with the appearance of a young boy. When he visited Earth, he spent his time traveling all over the world, even the depths of Atlantis and Sahara Desert.

The god of creation with the appearance of an elderly man. When he visited Earth, he spent his time listening to idol groups.

The god of wine and craftsmanship with the appearance of a plump adult man. He takes in interest on Ryoma after witnessing his stone sculptures and also becomes his friend.

The god of magic and academics with the appearance of a young bespectacled man who asks Ryoma some questions to confirm that he is not at risk of misusing his powers.
Serelipta
The god of fishing and ports with the appearance of an androgynous young boy. He takes an interest on Ryoma due to his ability to withstand the gods' powers to some extent and upon investigating his mind, discovers the truth about his harsh life and early death.

Bamboo Forest Laundry Shop

A member of the Trading Guild who becomes a manager of Bamboo Forest under Ryoma's. She later moves to Lenaf to manage the laundry's second shop.

Carla's twin brother who was also lent by the Trading Guild to be a manager of Ryoma's shop.

A bodyguard hired by Ryoma to protect one of his shops.
,   

Three slime researchers who were fired from the academy and become employees at the shop.

Bamboo forest's cook. She was hired at the same time alongside Fina, Jane and Maria.  
,   

All three left their home village together in search of work before being hired by Ryoma at Bamboo Forest.
  

Former assassins employed by Ryoma at Bamboo Forest as security for the shop as well as bodyguards if need be.

Adventurer's Guild

A female cat beastkin and rank B adventurer, she becomes Ryoma's first client after he becomes an adventurer when he is tasked to clean her house, later becoming his friend.

The master of the Adventurer's Guild's Gimul branch.

A female wolf beastman and Miya's friend.

A female tiger beastman and Miya's friend.

 
A female rabbit beastman and Miya's friend.
  

The receptionists at the Adventurer's Guild's Gimul branch.

Merchants Guild

Guild master at the Merchants Guild.

Others

Ryoma's co-worker during his previous life. Ryoma named the first slime he tamed in his honor, but the slime dies, leaving only its core.

A young female fox beastkin and Pioro Saionji's daughter, she trains to be a merchant like her father and befriends Ryoma during his stay in the city of Lenaf. She later moves to the capital to study at the Imperial Academy, becoming one of Eliaria's close friends.

Miyabi's father who is a merchant and a descendant of a Child of God, having maintained within his family many aspects and traditions of his ancestor, including his surname.

A merchant who is friends with the Jamil Family and President of the Morgan Trading Company who helps Ryoma open his laundry shop, later becoming his business partner in other enterprises.

The leader of the Semroid Troupe.
,   

Three female students of the Imperial Academy from different upbringings who befriend Miyabi and Eliaria and become part of their study group.

Media

Light novels
The series was first published online on the Shōsetsuka ni Narō website in January 2014 by Roy. A revised version of the series was then launched in September 2015. It was later acquired by Hobby Japan, who published the first volume as a light novel under their HJ Novels imprint in September 2017. The series is licensed in North America by J-Novel Club.

Manga
A manga adaptation of the series by Ranran began serialization in Square Enix's Manga UP! app and website on November 29, 2017. The manga is licensed in North America by Square Enix.

Anime
An anime adaptation of the series was announced by Hobby Japan on February 20, 2020, which was later confirmed to be a television series on April 17, 2020. The series was animated by Maho Film and directed by Takeyuki Yanase, with Kazuyuki Fudeyasu as story editor and screenwriter, Kaho Deguchi as character designer with Ririnra credited with the original designs, and Hiroaki Tsutsumi composing the music. While the first episode had an advanced premiere screening at FunimationCon 2020 on July 3, 2020, the series officially ran for 12 episodes in Japan from October 4 to December 20, 2020 on Tokyo MX and BS Fuji. Azusa Tadokoro performed the opening theme "Yasashii Sekai", while MindaRyn performed the ending theme "Blue Rose knows".

The series was licensed outside of Asia by Funimation. On October 31, 2020, Funimation announced that the series would receive an English dub, which premiered the following day. Following Sony's acquisition of Crunchyroll, the series was moved to Crunchyroll. Medialink has also licensed the series in South and Southeast Asia and streamed it on their Ani-One YouTube channel. 

On June 4, 2021, a second season was announced. Yuka Yamada replaced Kazuyuki Fudeyasu as the scriptwriter. It premiered on January 9, 2023. MindaRyn performed the opening theme "Way to go", while Azusa Tadokoro performed the ending theme "Drum-shiki Tansaki".

Episode list

Season 1

Season 2

Explanatory notes

References

External links
  at Shōsetsuka ni Narō 
  
  
  
 

2017 Japanese novels
Adventure anime and manga
Anime and manga based on light novels
Crunchyroll anime
Fiction about reincarnation
Gangan Comics manga
Isekai anime and manga
Isekai novels and light novels
J-Novel Club books
Japanese webcomics
Light novels
Light novels first published online
Maho Film
Medialink
Shōnen manga
Shōsetsuka ni Narō
Slice of life anime and manga
Tokyo MX original programming
Webcomics in print